Douglas Godfree (16 October 1881 – 5 August 1929) was a British fencer and modern pentathlete. He competed at the 1908 and 1912 Summer Olympics.

References

1881 births
1929 deaths
British male fencers
British male modern pentathletes
Olympic fencers of Great Britain
Olympic modern pentathletes of Great Britain
Fencers at the 1908 Summer Olympics
Fencers at the 1912 Summer Olympics
Modern pentathletes at the 1912 Summer Olympics
Sportspeople from London